Kristi E. Sweet (born 1976) is an American philosopher and associate professor of philosophy at Texas A&M University. She is known for her expertise on Kantian philosophy.

Books
 Kant on Practical Life: From Duty to History, Cambridge University Press, 2013,

References

External links
Kristi Sweet at Texas A&M
Works by Kristi Sweet

21st-century American philosophers
Continental philosophers
Philosophers of art
Philosophers of culture
Political philosophers
Social philosophers
Kant scholars
Philosophy academics
Living people
Loyola University Chicago alumni
Grand Valley State University faculty
Texas A&M University faculty
Villanova University alumni
1976 births
Heidegger scholars
Nietzsche scholars